Sir Walter de la Haye (died after 1309) was an English-born statesman and judge in Ireland of the late thirteenth and early fourteenth centuries, who served for many years as Sheriff of  County Waterford and as Chief Escheator, and briefly as Justiciar of Ireland. He was held in high regard by the English Crown, which protected him from accusations of corruption. He became a substantial landowner in two counties. He had children, but his family seems to have died out within a couple of generations.

Early career 

He first appeared in Ireland in 1271 as an attorney, who acted for the justices of the English Royal Courts, and was later appointed custodian of the Archdiocese of Dublin. The whole of his career was spent in Ireland. 

He became High Sheriff of County Waterford in 1272 and served in that office until 1284, receiving several official commendations for his diligence, and he was knighted in 1281 or 1282. He was invited to attend the coronation of King Edward I in 1274. He became Constable of Dungarvan Castle in County  Waterford and also Constable of 
King John's Castle, Limerick. He became a landed proprietor in Ireland: he was granted the manor and castle of Kilmeadan, County Waterford by the Justiciar of Ireland, Robert d'Ufford, in 1285. He was made custodian of the city of Waterford, in return for an annual payment to the Crown. He also acquired an estate at Knocktopher, County Kilkenny, in the early 1290s, through marriage to the widowed Alice Le Bret. 

He became Chief Escheator of Ireland in 1285 with special authority to negotiate with the Gaelic clans within his bailiwick. He also had more mundane tasks, such as the inquisition he held at New Ross in 1292 into the hotly disputed question of the ownership of a cargo of wine on the merchant ship The Alice of Harwich.<ref >Close Roll 20  Edward I </ref >

Charged with corruption 

His possession of substantial landed estates in Counties Waterford and Kilkenny, and his increasingly central role in Government, led to a clash with the le Poer family, whose power in the south-east of Ireland was growing steadily. The conflict led him to arrest and imprison the principal troublemaker of the family, Robert le Poer, on an unspecified charge. It may well have been the le Poers, aided by the Bishop of Emly, William de Clifford, who brought charges of corruption and "oppression" (the latter was a rather vague concept) against Haye in connection with his office of Escheator. The charges principally turned on his alleged harsh treatment of Crown tenants, whom he was accused of crippling financially with exorbitant rents. These were linked to similar but more credible charges against the Treasurer of Ireland, Nicholas de Clere (or Nicholas le Clerk) and his brother William, who had also quarrelled with Bishop de Clifford.

Haye went to England in 1290 to answer the charges against him and was completely exonerated. King Edward made clear his high regard for Haye, and his belief that Haye as Escheator had acted in the best interests of the Crown, especially in the matter of Crown rents. Edward did tactfully suggest that Haye should spend less time in sending lengthy and time-consuming reports about Irish affairs back to England.

The unfortunate Nicholas de Clere, on the other hand, was arrested on similar charges of corruption, and spent his last years in prison, having failed to have proven his innocence to the King's satisfaction, or been able to pay off his massive debts to the Crown. De Clere's brother William was also imprisoned briefly, but later restored to favour.

Haye, despite his high standing at Court, made the familiar complaint of civil servants in that era that his salary was constantly in arrears. He also complained about the difficulty in compiling his accounts.

Justiciar 

He acted as an itinerant justice regularly from 1278 onwards, principally in County  Dublin, and was a justice of the Court of the Justiciar from 1294 to 1298. In 1293 he sat on a commission to inquire into allegations of wrongdoing against the Justiciar, William de Vesci, and presided at the crucial meeting of the Privy Council of Ireland where John FitzGerald, 1st Earl of Kildare, made accusations against de Vesci, which were considered serious enough to be referred to Westminster, along with the Commission's own report. 

He was appointed Justiciar in 1294 following de Vesci's removal, on the recommendation of Sir  William de Essendon, the Lord High Treasurer of Ireland, and two other senior officials, and he was acting Justiciar in 1295–6, but was described as "locum tenens", an indication that this was a temporary appointment. During his brief tenure as Justiciar, he carried out a purge of dishonest Crown servants in Limerick, particularly those who had held office as Serjeant. Ball notes that Haye was inclined to clemency and compromise on this occasion: eight of those charged with corruption were acquitted, and only one was hanged. He attended the 1297 session of the Parliament of Ireland as representative for Kilkenny. He was still acting as a justice itinerant for County Dublin in 1306.

Last years 

In 1308 he asked to be relieved of all his official duties on account of his failing eyesight. He was still alive in the early spring of the following year, when he sold his lands at Knocktopher to Nigel le Brun (nephew of Fromund Le Brun, Lord Chancellor of Ireland) and his wife Amicia. He would no doubt have been disappointed to know that after his death his enemies the le Poers quickly acquired Kilmeadan Castle, where they remained until they were expelled by Cromwellian forces in about 1650. Knocktopher came through Amicia's second marriage to the influential Cusack family of County Meath.

Family 

He married Alice le Bret of Knocktopher, widow of Milo le Bret: she held the Knocktopher estate as her dower. They had two sons and a daughter. His son William was High Sheriff of County Waterford in his turn; his younger son Roger was a priest, who was presented to the living of Kilmeadan by King Edward I, and also acted as his father's Deputy as Escheator. His daughter married a man of bad character, against whom serious crimes including rape and kidnapping were alleged. The family seems to have died out within a generation or two. Edmund le Bret, who surrendered his interest in the family lands at Knocktopher, County Kilkenny in about 1292 to Haye, was his stepson, Alice's son by her previous marriage to Milo le Bret.

Sources
Ball, F. Elrington The Judges in Ireland 1221-1921 London John Murray 1926
Irish Manuscripts Commission  Calendar of Ormonde Deeds 1170-1350 Stationery Office, Dublin, 1932
Hand, Geoffrey English Law in Ireland 1290-1324 Cambridge University Press 1967
Mackay, Ronan "Haye, Sir Walter de la" Cambridge Dictionary of Irish Biography 2009
National Library of Ireland D 529 Grant by Walter de la Haye to Nigel le Brun of the whole manor of Knocktopher 2 March 1309Prestwich, Michael Edward I'' University of California Press 1988

Notes

People from County Waterford
14th-century Irish judges
Justices of the Irish King's Bench
Lords Lieutenant of Ireland
High Sheriffs of County Waterford
13th-century Irish judges
1310s deaths